Ethyl palmitate is an organic compound with the chemical formula C18H36O2. It is a colorless solid with a wax-like odor. Chemically, ethyl palmitate is the ethyl ester of palmitic acid.

Ethyl hexadecanoate is produced in aged whiskey, and is sometimes removed from the final product via chill filtering. Ethyl palmitate is used as a hair- and skin-conditioning agent.

References

Ethyl esters
Palmitate esters